The brush-furred mice, genus Lophuromys are a group of rodents found in sub-Saharan Africa.  They are members of the subfamily Deomyinae, a group only identifiable through molecular analysis.  Lophuromys is also known as the brush-furred rats, harsh-furred rats or coarse-haired mice.

Characteristics
The brush-furred mice are so named due to the unique, stiff hairs that make up their pelage. The texture is similar to a soft brush. They are peculiar looking for several reasons. The coat varies depending on species, but ranges from tan to greenish greys and dark brown. Some species have an almost purplish tint to the pelage and others can be speckled. The underside is rusty, orange, brown, or cream-colored. They are chunky mice with relatively short legs.

Most animals have noticeable scars, notched ears, or are missing part of their tails.  The skin is delicate and the animals appear to use this as a predator avoidance technique. The tail breaks easily and may be lost so that the animal can escape. Once lost, it does not regenerate. The skin tears easily, particularly in strategic positions such as the scruff of the neck. In fact, if an animal is held by the scruff of the neck, it is capable of struggling its way free by tearing itself loose, leaving behind a patch of skin containing hair and skin. Specimens found in museums are rarely seen that lack tears that have been sewn together.

Habitat and diet
Brush-furred mice appear to require moist areas and perhaps grasses.  They are generally excluded from dry savannahs and forests with dense canopies.  They are variable in degree of diurnality versus nocturnality.

They appear to feed more on animal matter than most muroids.  The proportion of animal material in the diet ranges from 40 to 100% depending on species.  Food consists of ants, other insects and invertebrates, small vertebrates, carrion, and plant matter.

Behaviour
Brush-furred mice are solitary and are reported to fight when placed together.  This may contribute to the wounds found on individuals.  A brush-furred mouse was recorded to have lived for over 3 years in captivity.

Allopatric speciation appears to have played an important role in shaping the evolution of this genus.  Research conducted on the group suggests that isolated species exist a relatively short distance away from one another.  Gene flow is either absent or greatly restricted among these isolated pockets.  This has led to differences detectable by karyotype, allozymes, and DNA sequencing.  The number of recognized species in this genus has increased in recent years and is probably still not representative of the true diversity of this group.

Species
21 species were accepted in this genus in 2005. This number has grown to 34.
Genus Lophuromys - brush-furred mice
Subgenus Kivumys
Yellow-bellied brush-furred rat, Lophuromys luteogaster
Medium-tailed brush-furred rat, Lophuromys medicaudatus
Woosnam's brush-furred rat, Lophuromys woosnami
Subgenus Lophuromys 
Angolan brush-furred mouse, Lophuromys angolensis
Ansorge's brush-furred mouse, Lophuromys ansorgei
Gray brush-furred rat, Lophuromys aquilus
Short-tailed brush-furred rat, Lophuromys brevicaudus
Thomas's Ethiopian brush-furred rat, Lophuromys brunneus
Mount Chercher brush-furred rat, Lophuromys chercherensis
Ethiopian forest brush-furred rat, Lophuromys chrysopus
Dieterlen's brush-furred mouse, Lophuromys dieterleni
Dudu's brush-furred rat, Lophuromys dudui
Eisentraut's brush-furred rat, Lophuromys eisentrauti
Yellow-spotted brush-furred rat, Lophuromys flavopunctatus
Hutterer's brush-furred mouse, Lophuromys huttereri
Kilonzo's brush furred rat, Lophuromys kilonzoi
Machandu's brush furred rat, Lophuromys machangui
Makundi's brush-furred rat, Lophuromys makundii
Black-clawed brush-furred rat, Lophuromys melanonyx
North Western Rift brush-furred rat, Lophuromys menageshae
Fire-bellied brush-furred rat, Lophuromys nudicaudus
Sheko Forest brush-furred rat, Lophuromys pseudosikapusi
Rahm's brush-furred rat, Lophuromys rahmi
Mount Cameroon brush-furred rat, Lophuromys roseveari
Sabuni's brush-furred rat, Lophuromys sabunii
Rusty-bellied brush-furred rat, Lophuromys sikapusi
Verhagen's brush-furred mouse, Lophuromys verhageni
Zena's brush-furred rat, Lophuromys zena
Unsorted
Lophuromys laticeps
Lophuromys margarettae
Lophuromys rita
Lophuromys simensis
Stanley's brush-furred rat, Lophuromys stanleyi

References

Further reading

Kingdon, J. 1997. The Kingdon Field Guide to African Mammals. Academic Press Limited, London.
Nowak, Ronald M. 1999. Walker's Mammals of the World, 6th edition. Johns Hopkins University Press, 1936 pp. 

Lophuromys
Taxa named by Wilhelm Peters